Acacia latescens, also known as Ball wattle, is a tree in the genus Acacia (in the family Fabaceae and the subgenus Plurinerves). It is native to the Northern Territory where it is common in the Top End.

Description
A. latescens is a tree growing from 4 to 9 m high. Its bark is brown and fissured. The  smooth branchlets are ribbed, and its stipules fall. The pulvinus is 3-5 mm long and smooth. The smooth phyllodes are curved, and are 80-260 mm long by 4-18 mm wide. They have two primary veins (sometimes 1 or 3) and the secondary may be oblique, veined like a feather or forming a network. The base of the phyllode narrows gradually but the apex is acute. There are three glands along the dorsal margin and at the pulvinus. The axilliary inflorescences are racemes or panicles, with  4-11 heads per raceme. The white/cream heads are globular, and 4-6 mm wide on smooth peduncles which are 5-16 mm long. The greyish pods (50-210 mm long by 11-20 mm wide) are straight, and raised over the seeds with a slightly thickened margin. The dark brown to black seeds (9-10 mm long by 5-7 mm wide) are oblique in the pod. 

It flowers from April to July and fruits from August to January.

Distribution
It is found in the following bioregions of the Northern Territory: Arnhem Coast, Arnhem Plateau, Central Arnhem, Daly Basin, Darwin Coastal, Gulf Fall and Uplands, Pine Creek, Sturt Plateau, Tiwi Cobourg, and Victoria Bonaparte.

Habitat 
It grows in eucalypt woodland.

Taxonomy
It was first described by George Bentham in 1842, from a specimen collected by Allan Cunningham on May-Day Island in van Diemen's Gulf, in 1818 on the first voyage of the Mermaid (Isolectotype BM000796904).

References

latescens
Flora of the Northern Territory
Plants described in 1842
Taxa named by George Bentham